Saint Thomas of Villanova Giving Alms is an oil on canvas painting by Murillo, created c. 1668, originally produced for the Capuchin monastery in Seville and now in the Museum of Fine Arts of Seville.

References

Paintings by Bartolomé Esteban Murillo
Paintings of saints
1668 paintings
Paintings in the Museum of Fine Arts of Seville